Jim Hayford (born May 5, 1967) is an American college basketball head coach who most recently coached at Seattle University. He previously coached at Eastern Washington University and Division III Whitworth University where he won about 80 percent of his games. His career winning percentage ranks among the top 10 among all active NCAA Division III coaches at the time.

On November 11, 2021, Hayford resigned after it was reported that he had twice repeated racial slurs.

Whitworth University
In addition to his success at coaching, Hayford compiled a record of 217-57 and a winning percentage of .792, eight 20-win seasons, six appearances in the NCAA Division III Tournament (including the last five consecutive seasons), five Northwest Conference championships, three NCAA DIII Sweet 16 appearances (2008, 2010, 2011) and one Elite Eight appearance (2011). He has earned five NWC Coach of the Year awards,  West Region Coach of the Year in the 2009-10 and 2010-11 seasons.

Eastern Washington
On March 29, 2011, Eastern Washington formally introduced Hayford as their head coach after 10 years at Whitworth. On June 13, 2014, Eastern Washington signed a five years extension to keep Hayford as head coach through the 2018-2019 season. On November 24, 2014, Hayford picked up his biggest win of his EWU coaching career and the men's basketball program by beating the Indiana Hoosiers on their homecourt, 88-86. The win snapped the Hoosiers 43 games non-conference home games winning streak, their first win against a Big Ten team and their first win against a crowd of 10,000+ fans. On March 14, 2015, Hayford led the Eagles to their second NCAA tournament appearance in school history with a 69-65 win over the Montana Grizzlies on their homecourt. Hayford and the Eagles played their second round match-up against the Georgetown Hoyas on March 19 in Portland at approximately 7 p.m. PST, where they lost 84-74.

Seattle
On March 29, 2017, Jim Hayford was hired as the new men's basketball head coach at Seattle University to replace Cameron Dollar.

In his first year as head coach, Hayford compiled a 20–14 record, the Redhawks' first 20-win season since 2008 and first 20-win season in Division I play since the 1960s. The Redhawks fell to Central Arkansas in the first round of the 2018 CBI tournament. In his second year as head coach, Hayford compiled an 18–15 record, marking the Redhawks' first back-to-back 18+ win seasons since 2008–09 and 2009–10. The Redhawks fell to Presbyterian in the first round of the 2019 CIT tournament.

On November 11, 2021, Hayford resigned after it was reported that he had twice repeated racial slurs. Assistant coach Chris Victor was named interim head coach.

Head coaching record

College

References

External links
Eastern Washington profile

1967 births
Living people
American men's basketball coaches
Basketball coaches from Ohio
Azusa Pacific Cougars men's basketball coaches
Azusa Pacific University alumni
Eastern Washington Eagles men's basketball coaches
High school basketball coaches in the United States
People from Amherst, Ohio
Seattle Redhawks men's basketball coaches
Sioux Falls Cougars men's basketball coaches
Sportspeople from Greater Cleveland
Whitworth Pirates men's basketball coaches